Sports Car International (SCI) was an automobile magazine published in the United States from 1986 to 2008 by Ross Periodicals Inc, first in Newport Beach, but then later in Novato, California.

History
The magazine was unabashedly enthusiast-oriented, assuming a good knowledge of sports cars, racing, and automotive history. The magazine was originally edited by Mark Ewing.  In the 1990s, (after the move from Newport Beach to Northern California) Jay Lamm served as editor; Lamm had worked at other publications, including Autoweek, and had written books on cars like the Mazda Miata. In 1994, SCI became the first magazine publication to go all-digital in its printing process. In 2006, Erik Gustafson served as editor, and upgraded the publication's layout, editorial style, and format to compete directly with rival top automotive publications.

The magazine ceased publication with the November 2008 edition due to cost factors such as a lack of advertising revenue. The publisher stated that all subscribers would ride out their subscription with Excellence, a magazine focused on Porsche automobiles. For those who already have subscriptions to Excellence and SCI, Forza, a Ferrari magazine would be the substitute.

The first magazine ever to be produced using computer to plate (CTP) process in 1994, by Publishers Press Inc.

Top sports cars

Sports Car International compiled a list of the Top Sports Cars of the last few decades.  The selections were simply the opinions of the magazine's editors. The following lists are taken from the magazine.

All Time
1. Ferrari 250 GTO
2. McLaren F1
3. Jaguar E-Type
4. Lamborghini Miura SV
5. Mercedes-Benz 300SL
6. Porsche 911 Carrera RS
7. Porsche 356
8. Porsche Carrera GT
9. Shelby 289 AC Cobra
10. Mazda MX-5

1960s

1. Jaguar E-Type
2. Shelby AC Cobra
3. Porsche 911
4. Lamborghini Miura
5. Chevrolet Corvette Stingray
6. Lotus Elan
7. Ferrari 250 GT SWB
7. Ferrari 275 GTB/4
8. Ferrari 250 GTO
9. Maserati Ghibli
10. Porsche 356 C
11. Ferrari 250 GT Berlinetta Lusso

1970s

1. Ferrari Daytona
2. Datsun 240Z
3. Lamborghini Countach
4. Lamborghini Miura SV
5. Ferrari 308
6. Ferrari Dino
7. Mazda RX-7
8. Porsche Carrera RS
9. De Tomaso Pantera
10. BMW M1

1980s

1. Porsche 959
2. Ferrari 288 GTO
3. VW Golf/Rabbit GTI
4. Audi Quattro
5. Ferrari F40
6. BMW M3
7. Porsche 911 Carrera
8. Toyota MR2
9. Renault 5 Turbo
10. Lamborghini Countach

1990s

1. Mazda MX-5/Mazda Miata
2. Porsche Boxster
3. Ferrari 550
4. McLaren F1
5. Porsche 911
6. Honda NSX/Acura NSX
7. Ferrari F355
8. Nissan 300ZX
9. Lotus Elise
10. Mazda RX-7

2000s

1. Porsche Carrera GT
2. Ford GT
3. Enzo Ferrari
4. Pagani Zonda C12S
5. Lotus Elise
6. Porsche Boxster S
7. Porsche 911 GT3
8. Lamborghini Gallardo
9. Lamborghini Murciélago
10. Subaru Impreza WRX

See also
 Excellence (magazine)

References

External links
 Archive from Archive.org of Sports Car International's former web site

Automobile magazines published in the United States
Monthly magazines published in the United States
Defunct magazines published in the United States
Magazines established in 1986
Magazines disestablished in 2008
Magazines published in California